Tetrahydrocortisol, or urocortisol, is a steroid and an inactive metabolite of cortisol.

See also
 Tetrahydrocortisone
 Tetrahydrocorticosterone

References

Human metabolites
Corticosteroids